German XXX. Corps (XXX. Armeekorps) was a corps in the German Army during World War II.

In 1939/40, the corps carried out border surveillance at the German West Border and then took part in the Battle of France and the Balkan campaign. From June 1941, it fought for three years on the Eastern Front, first in the south, then north and center to move south again after the Battle of Stalingrad. In 1944, the Corps retreated to Romania, where it was destroyed during the Jassy–Kishinev Offensive in August 1944. A second deployment followed as the 30th Army Corps z.bV. in the Netherlands in 1944/45.

Commanders

 General der Artillerie Otto Hartmann, 26 August 1939 - 25 March 1941
 Generalleutnant Eugen Ott, 25 March 1941 - 10 May 1941
 General der Infanterie Hans von Salmuth, 10 May 1941 – 27 December 1941
 General der Artillerie Maximilian Fretter-Pico, 27 December 1941 – 4 July 1944
 General der Kavallerie Philipp Kleffel, 4 July 1944 - 16 July 1944 
 Generalleutnant Georg-Wilhelm Postel, 16 July 1944 - 31 August 1944. (POW - Corps destroyed) 

Second formation:
 Generalleutnant Erich Heinemann 26 October 1944 - 15 November 1944 
 Generalleutnant Joachim von Tresckow 15 November 1944 - 23 November 1944 
 Generalleutnant Friedrich-Wilhelm Neumann 23 November 1944 - 16 December 1944
 General der Kavallerie Philipp Kleffel, 16 December 1944 - 25 April 1945 
 Generalleutnant Arnold Burmeister 25 April 1945 - 8 May 1945

Area of operations
 Germany : September 1939 – May 1940
 France : May 1940 – July 1940
 Poland : July 1940 - January 1941
 Balkans : January 1941 - June 1941
 Eastern Front, southern sector – June 1941 – August 1944 (Corps destroyed)
 Netherlands and North-western Germany : November 1944 - May 1945

See also
 List of German corps in World War II

External links

Army,30
Military units and formations established in 1939
1939 establishments in Germany
Military units and formations disestablished in 1944